Twelve Ways to Count is the debut album by British chamber pop band The Miserable Rich. It was released on 24 November 2008. Some of the songs contained were previously performed by James DeMalpaquet under the pseudonym 'James Grape' while in the band 'The Grape Authority' with fellow Miserable Rich member, Will Calderbank.

Track listing
 Early Mourning
 Pisshead
 Boat Song
 The Knife-Throwers Hand
 Monkey
 Muswell
 North Villas
 The Time That's Mine
 The Barmaids Cannon
 Poodle
 Merry Go Round
 Button My Lip
 Lullaby Of Death (Secret Track)
 Over And Over - Hot Chip Cover (iTunes Version Only)

Personnel
The Miserable Rich: 
William Calderbank: Cello
Mike Siddell: Violin
Jim Briffet: Guitar
James DeMalpaquet: Vocals

Guests:
Shaun Young: Guitar
Lindsey Oliver: Double Bass
Beatrice Sanjust Di Teulada: Vocals
Jacob Richardson: Guitar/Vocal
Alistair Straghan: Trumpets/Flugal Horn
Doon Macdonald: Clarinet
Tom Cowan: Resonator
Magnus Williams: Double Bass
Damian Fearns: Vocal
Sam Hewitt: Vocal
Sam Crombie: Drums
Adrian Walker: Drums
Vernon Aubrey: Beatbox

2008 debut albums
The Miserable Rich albums